The 2022 4 Hours of Barcelona was an endurance sportscar racing event that was held on 28 August 2022, as the fourth round of the 2022 European Le Mans Series.

In LMP2, the race was won by the #9 Prema Racing run Oreca 07-Gibson, driven by Lorenzo Colombo, Ferdinand Habsburg, and Louis Delétraz.

In LMP3, the race was won by the #13 Inter Europol Competition run Ligier JS P320, driven by Nico Pino, Charles Crews and Guilherme Oliveira.

In LMGTE, the race was won by the #77 Proton Competition run Porsche 911 RSR-19, driven by Christian Ried, Lorenzo Ferrari and Gianmaria Bruni.

Qualifying

Qualifying Result 
Pole position in each class are marked in bold.

Race

Race Result 
Class winners are marked in bold. - Cars failing to complete 70% of the winner's distance are marked as Not Classified (NC).

References 

Barcelona
4 Hours
Barcelona